The Democratic Unity Alliance ( Caṉanāyaka Oṉṟumaik Kūṭṭaṇi) is a registered political party in Sri Lanka. It was founded in 2004 after A. J. M. Muzammil and others broke away from the Sri Lanka Muslim Congress.

Electoral history

Notes

References

2004 establishments in Sri Lanka
Islamic political parties in Sri Lanka
Political parties in Sri Lanka
Political parties established in 2004